Freiherr von Münchhausen may refer to:
 Hieronymus Karl Friedrich, Freiherr von Münchhausen (1720–1797), German noble storyteller
 Otto von Münchhausen (Otto  Freiherr von Münchhausen) (1716–1774), German botanist
 Börries von Münchhausen (1874–1945), German poet and Nazi activist

See also 
 Münchhausen (disambiguation)
 Baron Munchausen, a fictional German nobleman 

Barons of Germany